The 2020–21 season was the club's third consecutive season in the Scottish Premiership, the top flight of Scottish football. Livingston also competed in the Scottish Cup and the League Cup.

Season Summary
Goalkeeper Gary Maley signed a new contract after a Twitter poll "joke" vote from fans. Marvin Bartley was named as new captain for the season. On 19 August, Lyndon Dykes left the club to join Queens Park Rangers for £2,000,000, breaking the record for the fee of a player sold by the club but part of the fee will go to Queen of the South as a sell-on clause. Having signed on 22 August, Anthony Stokes left the club on 15 September without making an appearance for the club. After the defeat to Celtic, Livi were bottom of the table but back to back wins seen them move up to the top six before the October International break. On 26 November, Gary Holt resigned as manager after failing to win in five matches. David Martindale and Tony Caig took over as caretakers with Martindale insisting he was "a changed man". Martindale’s appointment saw the club’s form improve dramatically, with the club getting 8 consecutive wins and going 10 consecutive games unbeaten after a 2-2 draw with Celtic. Livi reached the League Cup final for the first time since 2004 after beating St Mirren at Hampden Park. The SFA's 'Fit and proper person' hearing was a positive outcome for manager Martindale, who was turned down in his application to be a club official a year earlier but had since been supported publicly. The winning run continued as Livi won at Pittodrie for the first time since 2004, making it 14 matches unbeaten. Livi progressed into the Top Six cut-off but finished Sixth, failing to win any of their post-split matches, dropping one place from last season. But still, a top-half finish and their second-highest points total in the Premiership is not to be scoffed at. Martindale has exceeded expectations this season and then some.

Results & fixtures

Pre-season

Scottish Premiership

Scottish League Cup

Group stage

Knockout rounds

Scottish Cup

Squad statistics

Appearances
As of 15 May 2021

|-
|colspan="17"|Players who left the club during the season
|-

|}

Team statistics

League table

League Cup table

Transfers

Players in

Players out

Loans in

Loans out

See also
List of Livingston F.C. seasons

Footnotes

References

Livingston F.C. seasons
Livingston